The 2017 New York City Marathon was the 47th running of the annual marathon race in New York City, United States, which took place on November 5, 2017. The women's race was won by Shalane Flanagan, the first American woman to do so since Miki Gorman in 1977. The men's race was won by Kenyan Geoffrey Kamworor.

In the wheelchair races, Switzerland's Marcel Hug (1:37:21) and  Manuela Schär (1:48:09) won the men's and women's races, respectively. The handcycle races were won by France's Ludovic Narce (1:28:48) and New Zealand's Tiffiney Perry (1:54:09).

A total of 50,643 runners finished the race, comprising 29,583 men and 21,060 women.

Results

Men's race

Women's race

 † Ran in mass race

Wheelchair men

Wheelchair women

Handcycle men

Handcycle women

References 

Results
TCS New York City Marathon 2017. New York Road Runners. Retrieved 2020-05-06.
Men's results. Association of Road Racing Statisticians. Retrieved 2020-05-06.
Women's results. Association of Road Racing Statisticians. Retrieved 2020-05-06.

External links

New York Road Runners website

2017
New York City Marathon
Marathon
New York City Marathon